Irvan Spencer Williams (20 January 1908 – 17 October 1974) was an  Australian rules footballer who played a single game with Hawthorn in the Victorian Football League (VFL) in 1931.

Notes

External links 

1908 births
1974 deaths
Australian rules footballers from Geelong
Hawthorn Football Club players